Gémenos is a commune located 20 kilometers east of Marseille in the Bouches-du-Rhône department in the Provence-Alpes-Côte d'Azur region in southern France.

Population

History
A property abstract belonging to Wilhem, Count of Marseilles, dating back to February 9 934, noted for the first time the existence of a castrum named Geminas at the entry of the Saint Pons valley.

In 1204, the bishop of Marseilles Rainier founded the Cistercian abbey of Saint Pons.

Around the 15th century, Geminas was deserted.

In 1563 the Marquis d'Albertas Nicolas and his brother Gaspard, both of Italian origin, acquired the demesne of Gémenos, leading to the development of Gémenos as it is known today.

See also
Communes of the Bouches-du-Rhône department

References

External links

  Official town website

Communes of Bouches-du-Rhône
Bouches-du-Rhône communes articles needing translation from French Wikipedia